Whitney-on-Wye railway station was a station in Whitney-on-Wye, Herefordshire, England. The station was opened in 1864 and closed in 1962.

References

Further reading

Disused railway stations in Herefordshire
Railway stations in Great Britain opened in 1864
Railway stations in Great Britain closed in 1962
Former Midland Railway stations